This article covers Euro Gold and Silver coins Issued by the 'Banque Centrale Du Luxembourg'. It also covers rare cases of collectors coins (coins not planned for normal circulation) minted using other precious metals.  This article however, does not cover either the Luxembourg €2 commemorative coins or the Luxembourg Franc commemorative coins.

Also, other countries' euro Gold and Silver collections can be seen here

2002

2003

2004

2005

2006

2007

2008

2009
The following is the schedule for next year issues.

Notes

References
 

Luxembourg
Currencies of Luxembourg